Photronics, Inc is an American semiconductor photomask manufacturer. It was the third largest photomask supplier globally as of 2020.

History 
Founded 1969 at Danbury, Connecticut as "Photronic Labs, Inc." The company has manufacturing facilities within the USA (3), Taiwan (3), Europe (2), Mainland China (2), and one in Korea.

Technology 

Photronics' reticle and photomask products fall into three major categories; standard products, advanced products, and large area masks. Technologists choose from Photronics' reticles and photomasks for their micro-imaging platforms. The variety of technologies offered range from mature 1:1 and 5X technologies to advanced, demanding sub-wavelength and next generation lithographic applications.

Customers
20 largest customers:
 
Aptina Imaging Corporation, 	AU Optronics Corp. 	, Dongbu HiTek Co. Ltd., Freescale Semiconductor, Global Foundries, HannStar Display Corp., IM Flash Technologies, Inotera Memories, Jenoptik AG, LG Electronics, Magnachip Semiconductor, Micron Technology,	Nanya Technology Corporation, 	National Semiconductor Corporation,  	Novatek Microelectronics Corp., 	ON Semiconductor Corporation,  	Samsung Electronics Co.,  	ST Microelectronics, 	Texas Instruments,  	United Microelectronics Corp.

References 

Electronics companies of the United States
Companies listed on the Nasdaq
Companies based in Fairfield County, Connecticut
Manufacturing companies based in Connecticut